Yahia Nasseri is an Iraqi politician who has been the Governor of Dhi Qar since 2016.

References

Dhi Qar Governorate
Iraqi politicians
People from Dhi Qar Province
Iraqi Muslims
Living people
Year of birth missing (living people)